The Shulman House is a mid-century steel home and studio in the Hollywood Hills. In 1947 architectural photographer Julius Shulman asked architect Raphael Soriano to build him a house and studio in the Hollywood Hills. By August 1947 the design was decided upon, and construction began in the early months of 1949. The building took nine months to complete and was occupied in March 1950. Garrett Eckbo designed the landscaping. It has remained unaltered, and the Shulman House was designated a Historic-Cultural Monument by the City of Los Angeles in 1987.

The house was sold for $2,250,000 on November 24, 2010, to writer Jonah Lehrer, who resides there with his wife Sarah L. Liebowitz.

References

Wagener, Wolfgang. Raphael Soriano.  New York, London: Phaidon Press, 2002. 
Smith, Elizabeth & Goessel, Peter. Case Study Houses.  Taschen Verlag, 2002. 
Soriano, Raphael. Substance and function in architecture. Oral History Program, University of California, Los Angeles, 1988. ASIN: B00072EGNI

External links
 Photos from Architect Magazine
 Photo tour of Shulman House (Adobe Flash)

Houses in Los Angeles
Los Angeles Historic-Cultural Monuments
Raphael Soriano buildings
Hollywood Hills